Joseph Bottum may refer to:

 Joseph Bottum (author) (born 1959), American author
 Joseph H. Bottum (1903–1984), Lieutenant Governor and U.S. Senator from South Dakota
 Joseph H. Bottum (state legislator) (1853–1946), member of the South Dakota Senate

See also
Joseph "Joe" Bottom (born 1955), American swimmer